KREM (channel 2) is a television station in Spokane, Washington, United States, affiliated with CBS. It is owned by Tegna Inc. alongside CW affiliate KSKN (channel 22). Both stations share studios on South Regal Street in the Southgate neighborhood of Spokane, while KREM's transmitter is on Krell Hill to the southeast.

The station is carried on cable systems in Calgary and Edmonton, Alberta, Canada, both of which are double the size of KREM's American coverage area. One result of this is that stations in Calgary and Edmonton air American shows on Pacific Time, even though Calgary and Edmonton are both on Mountain Time. It is one of five local Spokane area television stations seen in Canada on the Shaw Direct satellite service. It can also been seen on local cable systems in southeastern British Columbia.

KREM is one of two CBS affiliates based in the Spokane television market; KREM is typically considered the primary CBS affiliate for the market. However, Sinclair Broadcast Group-owned KLEW-TV (channel 3), based in Lewiston, Idaho, focuses on the southern portion of the market including the Lewis–Clark Valley and the Palouse. Both KREM and KLEW are available on Dish Network and DirecTV throughout the Spokane market.

History
KREM-TV signed on October 31, 1954, with an "inaugural program" at 6:30 p.m., followed by a showing of the 1933 movie The Private Life of Henry VIII.  It was originally owned by Cole Wylie alongside KREM radio (AM 970, now KTTO; and FM 92.9, now KZZU-FM). The King Broadcasting Company, run by Seattle businesswoman Dorothy Bullitt, bought the KREM stations from Wylie in 1957; the radio stations were sold off in 1984. (Coincidentally, the former KREM-FM is now a sister station to KXLY-TV.) However, channel 2 retained the -TV suffix in its callsign until 2009.

KREM-TV initially had a dual affiliation with ABC and the DuMont Network, the latter shared with cross-town competitor KXLY-TV because of its then-CBS affiliation at the time. After DuMont dissolved, KREM continued as an exclusive ABC affiliate. In the late 1950s, the station was briefly affiliated with the NTA Film Network. KREM-TV was affiliated with ABC until August 8, 1976, when it swapped affiliations with KXLY-TV, whom CBS announced would be dropped in February for constantly preempting or delaying its network shows; however, CBS did not announce initially who would become their new affiliate in the market. On August 8, the affiliation switch went into full effect, with CBS programming moving to KREM (KREM wanted to wait until ABC finished airing the network's coverage of the 1976 Summer Olympics to make the switch). KXLY then picked up KREM's old ABC affiliation, KREM thus became Spokane's new CBS affiliate. Initially, CBS had approached KHQ-TV, while KREM was considered for a possible NBC affiliation because of the King Broadcasting Company's sister stations in Seattle and Portland also being NBC affiliates, but KREM elected to take the CBS affiliation instead. It was the only non-NBC affiliated station in the King Broadcasting portfolio.

King Broadcasting was sold in 1992 to the Providence Journal Company, which merged with Belo Corporation five years later. On June 13, 2013, the Gannett Company announced that it would acquire Belo. The sale was completed on December 23.

On June 29, 2015, the Gannett Company split in two, with one side specializing in print media and the other side specializing in broadcast and digital media. KREM and KSKN were retained by the latter company, named Tegna.

KREM and KSKN are a part of a cluster of television stations in the Northwestern United States owned by Tegna, which includes KING-TV and its sister station KONG in Seattle; KGW in Portland, Oregon; and KTVB in Boise. All four stations had provided material to co-owned Northwest Cable News, a regional 24-hour cable news service based in Seattle that served much of the region. KREM was the only non-NBC affiliate to be a primary contributor to NWCN, with the exception of KSKN and Seattle independent station KONG. The channel, which started in 1995, shut down on January 6, 2017.

Programming
As of September 13, 2021, KREM currently features CBS programming, as well as local news, public affairs and syndicated entertainment programming including The 700 Club, Dr. Phil, and You Bet Your Life.

KREM aired the Gonzaga Bulldogs men's basketball team's NCAA tournament championship game appearances in 2017 and 2021.

In 1987, KREM was one of numerous CBS affiliates that declined to carry an adaptation of Garbage Pail Kids, owing to concerns about it being a promotion for the then-popular trading card line of that name and about its heavy violence and ridiculing of the disabled; because of these decisions, CBS opted to remove the cartoon from its Saturday morning lineup and the series, to date, has never aired in the United States.

News operation
KREM airs 28½ hours of newscasts with a two-hour morning broadcast, a noon telecast, and evening telecast at 4:00, 5:00, 6:00, and 11:00 p.m., along with weekend telecasts every Saturday and Sunday at 5:00, 6:00, and 11:00 p.m. KREM is still the only station in Spokane to hold a monopoly on midday newscasts for the Spokane area as of 2021.

In 1997, KREM, with its reporter Tom Grant, won an Alfred I. duPont–Columbia University Award "for Investigative Reporting on the Wenatchee Child Sex Ring."

In April 2010, KREM and KSKN began broadcasting its local newscasts in 16:9 enhanced definition widescreen, and KREM became the third station in Spokane to switch in either HD or widescreen.

From September 15, 2014, to January 2, 2015, KREM was the only station to air their newscasts from 7:00-9:00 a.m. on its sister station KSKN. KREM switched to Gannett's "This is Home" music and graphics package on October 25, 2014, at the 5:00 newscast. KREM became the last station in the Spokane market to switch their newscasts to HD.

On October 17, 2021, the station had to apologize for showing a moving image from a pornographic video on a weather center monitor during that evening's 6 p.m. newscast, and the origin of the video's appearance on an internal station monitor, be it internally or from another source, is under police and corporate investigation.

Notable former on-air staff
 Paul Deanno – anchor/meteorologist (1997–1999); now chief meteorologist for WMAQ-TV in Chicago.
 Eric Johnson – sports director (1987–1989); now weeknight news anchor for KOMO-TV in Seattle.
 Tim Lewis – sports anchor, then sports director (September 2006–March 2012)
 Maureen O'Boyle – anchor (1986–1990); formerly weeknight news anchor at WBTV in Charlotte, North Carolina. Now retired.
 Nadine Woodward – anchor (1990-2009); Mayor of Spokane.

Technical information

Subchannels
The station's digital signal is multiplexed:

Analog-to-digital conversion
KREM discontinued regular programming on its analog signal, over VHF channel 2, on June 12, 2009, the official date in which full-power television stations in the United States transitioned from analog to digital broadcasts under federal mandate. The station's digital signal remained on its pre-transition UHF channel 20. Through the use of PSIP, digital television receivers display the station's virtual channel as its former VHF analog channel 2.

Translators

References

External links

Tegna Inc.
CBS network affiliates
True Crime Network affiliates
Court TV affiliates
Twist (TV network) affiliates
Television channels and stations established in 1954
1954 establishments in Washington (state)
REM (TV)
Former Gannett subsidiaries